484th may refer to:

484th Aero Construction Squadron, part of the 53d Wing at Eglin Air Force Base, Florida
484th Air Expeditionary Wing, provisional United States Air Force unit assigned to the United States Air Force Air Combat Command
484th Bombardment Squadron, inactive United States Air Force unit
484th Fighter-Interceptor Squadron, inactive United States Air Force unit

See also
484 (number)
484, the year 484 (CDLXXXIV) of the Julian calendar
484 BC